The Sleeper Gold Mine was a high-grade gold mine operated by AMAX Gold  from 1986 until 1996, producing 1.66 million ounces of gold and 2.3 million ounces of silver. It is located about 25 miles northwest of Winnemucca in Humboldt County, Nevada.  This was an epithermal (hot springs) gold deposit,  formed by volcanism during Basin and Range extensional tectonics. The Sleeper Rhyolite dates to 16.3-16.5 million years (latest Early Miocene), and the gold mineralization dates to about 14.3-15.8 million years (during the early Middle Miocene). 

The property is currently (2019) owned by Paramount Gold.

References

External links
Sleeper rhyolite  gold ore. Geologic description of the specimen above.

 

Gold mines in Nevada
Humboldt County, Nevada